The 2023 Sabah political crisis began on 6 January 2023, when the state government of Sabah led by Gabungan Rakyat Sabah (GRS) collapsed when its coalition party Barisan Nasional (BN) withdrew its support. The Leader of UMNO Sabah, a component party of BN, Bung Moktar Radin, Kinabatangan Member of Parliemnt and Lamag Assemblyman, cited a lack of confidence in the leadership of Chief Minister of Sabah Hajiji Noor in the withdrawal. On 9 January, both Malaysian prime minister Anwar Ibrahim and deputy prime minister Ahmad Zahid Hamidi travelled to Kota Kinabalu to meet with Sabah political leaders.

As of 6 February, there are no changes in the status quo regarding the government of Sabah, following the decision of 5 UMNO MLAs who publicly supported Hajiji despite Bung's decision, and reshuffle of the state cabinet on 11 January as a result.

Background

Collapse of BN Sabah 

In 2018, after BN's loss at the 2018 Malaysian general election at the federal level to Pakatan Harapan (PH), Sabah-based BN component parties, United Sabah Party (PBS), United Sabah People's Party (PBRS), Sabah Progressive Party (SAPP), Liberal Democratic Party (LDP) and United Pasokomomogun Kadazandusun Murut Organisation (UPKO; now PH-backed United Progressive Kinabalu Organisation) have left BN Sabah in response to their loss, leaving only UMNO Sabah and MCA Sabah as component party.
This caused Musa Aman lost his majority as Chief Minister in favour of WARISAN's Shafie Apdal.

Hajiji Noor, UMNO Sabah chairman and Sulaman Assemblyman, together with other members, including Ronald Kiandee, Azizah Mohd Dun and Masidi Manjun, have left the party in a mass resignation to joining Sabah chapter of BERSATU, vowing to establish a new local-based independent coalition for all Sabah-based parties. Bung Moktar Radin, sole survived UMNO Sabah member, vows to rebuild the party when he was elected as the new state chairman, replacing the latter.

Formation of GRS and Hajiji's rise 

In 2020, in facing of the upcoming state election, then Prime Minister Muhyiddin Yassin met Hajiji to form Gabungan Rakyat Sabah (GRS) to topple WARISAN+ government. The decision was agreed, using Gabungan Parti Sarawak's formula to stay strive.

Prior to the election, GRS was formally launched to the public by Muhyiddin and Hajiji, initially organised by BN, PBS and Perikatan Nasional (PN).

In the event, GRS secured the simple majority to form the new government, defeating WARISAN which secure less majority than needed. Hajiji was officially elected as new Chief Minister and takes oath in front of Governor Juhar Mahiruddin in post-election, succeeding Shafie.

Registration and launching ceremony of GRS 
In 2022, the Registry of Societies (RoS) formally registered GRS as a coalition political party. At the time of its registration, the coalition, consists PBS, SAPP, Homeland Solidarity Party (STAR), the new United Sabah National Organisation (USNO Baru) and formerly BERSATU Sabah, were the latest parties to joining it, all of them were former BN Sabah components.

It was 100% local coalition as there were no participation of peninsula-based parties. Hajiji later elected as the first registered chairman, assisted by Masidi, Bung, Jeffrey Kitingan and Joachim Gunsalam.

At the same time, they have launched the coalition at a large ceremony in Kota Kinabalu to welcome the latest Sabah-based coalition political party.

Event

Mass resignation of BERSATU Sabah members and its expulsion from GRS 
In 2023, in response to PN's defeat in 15th general election, Hajiji announced that he and all members of BERSATU Sabah have resigned from the party, vowing to form a new political party to reclaim the autonomy of Sabah, that ultimately created Direct Members of GRS to allowing independent assemblymans to joining it.

The next day, Ronald was announced as the new state party chairman and subsequently, BERSATU has been expelled from GRS.

Pullover of BN Sabah and Shahelmey's resistance 
In response to Hajiji's decision, Bung announced that BN Sabah has been pulled their support against the Chief Minister, claiming that he has breached party hopping prevention law.

Later that day, he met Shafie to discuss about the possible form the new coalition to assure the Senallang Assemblyman returned to the Chief Minister's Office.

Amid the crisis, five UMNO Sabah members, Shahelmey Yahya (Tanjung Keramat), Jasnih Daya (Pantai Dalit), Yusof Yacob (Sindumin), James Ratib (Sugut) and Mohd Arsad Bistari (Tempasuk) still support Hajiji until his term expired and denounces Bung's decision, albeit facing discipline action from UMNO, including possible expulsion from the party.

On 21 February 2023, Yusof Yacob, along with other 8 MLAs support Hajiji. At the same time, Yusof Yacob, James Ratib, Jasnih Daya, Arshad Bistari, Hamid Awang, Mohammad Mohamarin, Ben Chong and Norazlinah joined PGRS.

Hajiji's attempted ouster and Bung Mokhtar's expulsion from cabinet

On 5 January 2023, Bung Mokhtar and Shafie launched an attempt to oust Hajiji and reinstall Shafie as Chief Minister.

These attempts were foiled by members of the GRS.

Takeover of Gagasan Rakyat 

In 5 February, Hajiji Noor, among with other members of former BERSATU Sabah, had takover of little known Parti Gagasan Rakyat Sabah (GAGASAN) from its previous leader, Stephen Jacob Jimbangan. In 9 December 2022, the party had already accepted as its member prior to first Hajiji cabinet's collapse.

Response

Federal level 

The day after the failed coup, prime minister Anwar Ibrahim and his deputy Ahmad Zahid Hamidi flown to Sabah to meet Hajiji about the crisis.

They gave him opinion, need to new election or reshuffling cabinet, in which he choose the latter.

State level 

In the aftermath of the crisis, Hajiji make a major decision, including sack Bung from his cabinet for the latter's responsible. Instead, he appoint Shahelmey to replace Kinabatangan member of parliament as new deputy chief minister and Minister of Works.

Party level 

UMNO and BN Sabah, led by Bung, on January announced that they had pullover their support against Sulaman assemblyman for his responsible quit BERSATU. Later, Social Democratic Harmony Party, led by Peter Anthony, make the same decision.

A month later, Gagasan Rakyat, a little-known 2013 political party in Sabah, had been take over by Hajiji along with others as BERSATU Sabah's replacement, as the party also struggle for Sabahans' rights, autonomies and interests.

On 12 February 2023, Barisan Nasional Secretary General, Zambry Abd. Kadir said Barisan Nasional decided to support the Sabah Government led by Hajiji Noor as Sabah Chief Minister.

See also 

 2020–2022 Malaysian political crisis
 2020 Sabah state election

References 

Government crises
2023 in Malaysian politics
Politics of Sabah
Political history of Malaysia